Gerhard M. Sessler (born 15 February 1931 in Rosenfeld, Baden-Württemberg, Germany) is a German inventor and scientist. He is Professor emeritus at the Department of Electrical Engineering and Information Technology of the Technische Universität Darmstadt.

Together with James E. West, he co-invented the foil electret microphone at Bell Laboratories in 1962 and together with Dietmar Hohm the silicon microphone in 1983.

Life 

From 1950 to 1959, Sessler studied physics at Universities of Freiburg, Munich, and Göttingen. He received his diploma in 1957 and his Ph.D. from the University of Göttingen in 1959. After working in the United States at Bell Labs until 1975, he returned to the academia in Germany. From 1975 to 2000, he worked as a professor of electrical engineering at the Department of Electrical Engineering and Information Technology of the Technische Universität Darmstadt where he invented the silicon microphone. Since 1999, Sessler is Professor emeritus.

He holds over 100 international patents, among them 18 US-patents. The first one, US 3,118,022, with James E. West, was issued on 14 January 1964.

Sessler is the author/editor of several books on electrets and acoustics. In 2014, together with Ning Xiang, he co-edited a memorial book on Manfred R. Schroeder published by Springer. Furthermore, he is well known for his over 300 scientific papers in prestigious international magazines and journals.

Gerhard Sessler was married to Renate Sessler and has three children: Cornelia, Christine and Gunther.

Publications 

 Sessler, G.M.. (2006). Progress in electroacoustic transducer research. The Journal of the Acoustical Society of America. DOI: 10.1121/1.4787543
Sessler, G.M.. (1980). Physical principles of electrets. In: Sessler G.M. (eds) Electrets. Topics in Applied Physics, vol 33. Springer, Berlin, Heidelberg. 
Sessler, G.M.. (1981). Piezoelectricity in Polyvinylidene Fluoride. Journal of The Acoustical Society of America - J ACOUST SOC AMER. 70. 10.1121/1.387225. 
Bauer, Siegfried & Gerhard, Reimund & Sessler, G.M.. (2004). Ferroelectrets: Soft Electroactive Foams for Transducers. Physics Today. 57. 37-43. 10.1063/1.1688068.

Awards 
 Fellow of the Acoustical Society of America, 1964
Fellow of the IEEE, 1976
Fellow of the American Physical Society, 1991
George R. Stibitz Trophy of AT&T, 1993
 Helmholtz-medal of the Deutsche Gesellschaft für Akustik, 1993
 Silver Helmholtz-Rayleigh-medal of the Acoustical Society of America, 1997
 Induction into the National Inventors Hall of Fame, 1999
 Technology Award of the Eduard Rhein Foundation, 2007
Honorary doctorate from the National Academy of Sciences of Belarus, 2010
 Benjamin Franklin Medal in Electrical Engineering of The Franklin Institute, with James E. West, 2010
IEEE/RSE James Clerk Maxwell Medal, 2012
 Gold Medal of the Acoustical Society of America, 2015

References

External links
Inventor Hall of Fame Profile
Gerhard Sessler, homepage at the Technical University of Darmstadt

1931 births
Living people
20th-century German inventors
Fellow Members of the IEEE
Fellows of the American Physical Society
Fellows of the Acoustical Society of America
ASA Gold Medal recipients
Academic staff of Technische Universität Darmstadt